The Australian scrub python (Simalia kinghorni), or simply scrub python is a species of snake in the family Pythonidae. The species is indigenous to forests of northern Australia. It is one of the world's longest and largest snakes, and is the longest and largest in Australia. Recently, it has been reclassified to the genus Simalia alongside a few other former Morelia species, but scientific debate over this continues.

Taxonomy
American herpetologist Olive Griffith Stull described the taxon in 1933 from a specimen at the Museum of Comparative Zoology that had been collected at Lake Barrine in north Queensland, classifying it as a subspecies of the amethystine python based on its larger number of scales. The specific name, kinghorni, is in honour of Australian herpetologist and ornithologist James Roy Kinghorn. It was first raised to species status by Wells and Wellington in 1984, and given the name Australiasis kinghorni. American biologist Michael Harvey and colleagues investigated the amethystine python complex and confirmed its classification as a separate species based on cladistic analysis of mitochondrial cytochrome b sequences and morphology. In 2014 cladistic analysis of nuclear and mitochondrial genes of pythons and boas, R. Graham Reynolds and colleagues concluded that the support for its distinctness was weak.

Description
This snake is commonly considered arboreal or tree-dwelling, making it one of the world's largest and longest arboreal species of snakes. This snake has an ornate back pattern consisting of browns and tans, with many different natural variations. Its belly is usually white, sometimes with some yellows.

Size
S. kinghorni exhibits an unusual sexual dimorphism among pythons. Males are usually a third longer and twice as heavy. On Tully, a river about 140 km south of Cairns, 24 adult females were measured.
In the past, data on the lengths of individuals longer than 6 meters were repeatedly mentioned in the literature, and all of them today can no longer be verified and cause serious doubts, in particular, in Fearn & Sambono (2000).

Distribution and habitat

S. kinghorni in mostly is found in Northern Australia, in Queensland and Cape York Peninsula. The species also occurs in several Islands of Torres Strait (e.g. Hinchinbrook). On the mainland, its range extends from the tip of the Cape York Peninsula south along the coastal rainforest through the Atherton Tableland, the forested eastern foothills of the Great Dividing Range, along the coast through Mount Speck to the Burdekin River south of Townsville. In 2004, an even more southern population was described in the Conway rainforest, south of Airlie Beach. Accurate information about the population size and possible connections with more northern populations is not yet available. However, it is assumed that it was installed in 1990 by adult animals that escaped from the local zoo, and has been successfully distributed since then living within various forests and more densely vegetated parts of the Australian bush.

Diet

S. kinghorni is one of the largest land predators in Australia, and depending on the habitat, age and size, the prey range can vary from small mammals, birds and reptiles to wallabies. The basis of the diet consists of birds and mammals. Among them, for example, rainbow bee-eaters (Merops ornatus), bush rats (Rattus fuscipes), northern quolls (Dasyurus hallucatus), spectacled flying fox (Pteropus conspicillatus), northern brown bandicoots (Isoodon macrourus), long-nosed bandicoots (Perameles nasuta) and striped possums (Dactylopsila trivirgata). In addition, on the outskirts of settlements, the species repeatedly feeds on domestic poultry. Relatively often there is also predation of pythons on small wallaby species in particular agile wallabies (Notamacropus agilis), red-legged pademelons (Thylogale stigmatica) and Bennett's tree-kangaroos (Dendrolagus bennettianus).

In captivity
The Australian scrub python is somewhat rare in the pet trade outside of Australia. However, with captive breeding projects and hobbyists interested in the species, it is becoming more available, with its New Guinea counterparts being much more available (especially in the United States).

Gallery

References

Apex predators
Reptiles described in 1933
Snakes of Australia
Pythonidae
Taxa named by Olive Griffith Stull